NA-252 (Karachi-XIV) was a constituency for the National Assembly of Pakistan. After the 2018 delimitations, its area has been divided between NA-243 (Karachi East-II) and NA-244 (Karachi East-III), while NA-245 (Karachi East-IV) consists entirely of the western part of NA-252.

Election 2013  

General elections were held on 11 May 2013. Abdul Rasheed Godil of Muttahida Qaumi Movement won by 91,339 votes and became the member of National Assembly.

Election 2008 

General elections were held on 18 Feb 2008. Abdul Rasheed Godil of Muttahida Qaumi Movement won by 87,280 votes.

Election 2002 

General elections were held on 10 Oct 2002. Muhammad Hussain Mehanti of Muttahida Majlis-e-Amal won by 33,089 votes.

References

External links 
Election result's official website

NA-252
Abolished National Assembly Constituencies of Pakistan